Torben Betts (born 10 February 1968, in Stamford, Lincolnshire) is an English playwright, screenwriter and actor.

Betts attended the University of Liverpool, where he read English Literature and English Language, and originally trained to become an actor but later changed course to begin writing plays. Betts stated that part of the reason for this transition was the difficulty he faced as an actor without an agent and that playwriting allowed him to "exercise all my instincts as an actor without actually having to live the life". In 1999 Alan Ayckbourn invited him to be the resident dramatist at Scarborough's Stephen Joseph Theatre.

A Listening Heaven premiered there that year before a second production took place at the Edinburgh Royal Lyceum in 2001. The play was nominated as the TMA Best New play that year. During this period Betts was enjoying success on the London fringe at the Battersea Arts Centre with plays like Incarcerator, a drama in rhyming couplets and The Biggleswades at the White Bear Theatre Club. Also in that year (2001), his play Clockwatching initiated a series of co-productions between the Orange Tree Theatre in Richmond and The Stephen Joseph Theatre, producing theatre in the round. Betts works in two very distinct styles: a darkly comic social realism, reminiscent of the plays of Ayckbourn or Mike Leigh, and a more tragic, poetic style of a kind associated with dramatists such as Howard Barker.

His brutal anti-Blair satire The Unconquered, in a touring production by Scotland's Stellar Quines Theatre Company, won the 2007 Best New Play award at the Critics' Awards for Theatre in Scotland.

Critical reception for Betts's plays has been mostly very positive: The Daily Telegraph claims he has a "profound and highly original theatrical voice", while Liz Lochhead (the former makar or national poet of Scotland) suggests he "is just about the most original and extraordinary writer of drama we have." Michael Billington in his **** Guardian review of Invincible commented that "Torben Betts should be a bigger name."

Invincible played at the Orange Tree Theatre March/April 2014 to great critical and popular acclaim and is the fourth of his plays to premiere at that theatre, following Clockwatching (2001), The Company Man (2010) and Muswell Hill (2012). The production transferred to London's St. James Theatre in July 2014, again receiving glowing reviews across the board (see the review in the London Evening Standard, Paul Taylor's review and Alice Jones' interview with the playwright also in the Independent).

He also wrote the screenplay for the British independent feature film Downhill, which was released in cinemas nationwide on 30 May 2014. The Independent said "his screenplay for this engaging, quintessentially British road/rambling movie combines knockabout comedy with surprisingly bleak observations."

A revival of his acclaimed 2012 play Muswell Hill transferred to London's Park Theatre in February 2015, while his political tragedy, centring on the 2015 General Election, (What Falls Apart) opened at Newcastle's Live Theatre in April of that year. A production of his version of Anton Chekhov's The Seagull opened at Regent's Park Open Air Theatre on 24 June 2015, directed by Matthew Dunster. (See the review in Time Out.) He has also adapted Get Carter for Northern Stage, Newcastle, where it opened in February 2016, garnering 4- and 5-star reviews. See Betts' article about adapting the Ted Lewis novel in the Independent and the Guardian review.

The Original Theatre Company embarked on a four-month UK tour of Invincible in 2016, which it remounted in 2017. His political tragi-comedy (The National Joke), directed by Henry Bell, played in rep at the Stephen Joseph Theatre over the summer of 2016. See the BBC's interview with the playwright, June 2016.

A major tour of Invincible (in Spanish Invencible) took place throughout Spain over 2016/17, including runs at the Teatro Arriaga in Bilbao and at the Teatros del Canal in Madrid. The production starred Maribel Verdú and Pilar Castro and was directed by Daniel Veronese. The play was remounted in September 2019 with the same cast.

In 2017 the play was produced in New York, Argentina and the Czech Republic. On 3 December 2017 a major production opened at the Teatr 6.pietro in Warsaw, directed by Eugeniusz Korin. Another production opened in Gdansk in the summer of 2019.

Further productions of the play in 2020 took place in Athens, Ostrava, Lima, Buenos Aires and Gdansk.

In November/December 2017 the off-Broadway company the Barrow Group produced the US premiere of his 2012 play Muswell Hill.

His most recent play Monogamy toured the UK before a five-week run at London's Park Theatre in June/July 2018. It starred Janie Dee, Patrick Ryecart, Jack Archer, Charlie Brooks and Genevieve Gaunt. A second UK tour of the play (revised and retitled as Caroline's Kitchen) took place in the first half of 2019 before taking part in the Brits-off-Broadway Festival. The remount starred Caroline Langrishe, Aden Gillett, James Sutton and Jasmyn Banks.

The play opened at Teatr Wzpolczesny in Warsaw on 18 January 2020.

His online play Apollo 13: The Dark Side of the Moon, starring Tom Chambers, began streaming in October 2020.

He is acting in the film version of Invincible, alongside Laura Howard, Samantha Seager and Daniel Copeland. The film is scheduled for release in late 2022.

Bibliography

Film
 Downhill (2014)
 Guillemot (2015)
 Invincible (2022)

Selected theatre
A Listening Heaven (1999)
Incarcerator (1999)
Five Visions of the Faithful (2000)
The Biggleswades (2001)
Clockwatching (2001)
The Last Days of Desire (2001, BBC Radio play)
Her Slightest Touch (2004)
The Lunatic Queen (2005)
The Unconquered (2007)
The Error of their Ways (2007)
The Swing of Things (2007)
Lie of the Land (2008)
The Company Man (2010)
Muswell Hill (2012)
Invincible (2014)
What Falls Apart (2015)
The Seagull (2015)
Get Carter (2016)
The National Joke (2016)
Monogamy (2018) 
Caroline's Kitchen (2019) 
It Never Happened (2019)
Rossmore Hall (2019), adaptation of Ibsen's Rosmersholm
Apollo 13: The Dark Side of the Moon (2020)
The Illusion of Time (2021)
Eight Little Criminals (2022)
The Book of Revelations (2023)

Publications (Oberon Books)
Plays One (A Listening Heaven, Mummies and Daddies, Clockwatching), (2000)
Plays Two (Incarcerator, Five Visions of the Faithful, Silence and Violence, The Biggleswades, The Last Days of Desire), (2001)
Plays Three (The Optimist, The Swing of Things, The Company Man), (2008)
 The Lunatic Queen, 2005
 The Unconquered, 2007
 The Error of Their Ways, 2007
 Lie of the Land, 2008
 Muswell Hill, 2012
 Invincible, 2014
 What Falls Apart, 2015
 The Seagull, 2015
 The National Joke, 2016
 Monogamy, 2018
 Caroline’s Kitchen, 2019
 It Never Happened, 2019

Awards and nominations
 Winner, Best New Play 2006/07 for The Unconquered, Critics Awards for Theatre in Scotland
 Nominated, Edinburgh Fringe First Award 2008 for Lie of the Land
 Nominated, Best New Play 2001 for A Listening Heaven, TMA Awards
 Nominated/shortlisted, Verity Bargate Award 2000 for Mummies and Daddies
 Nominated, Best New Play at the Off West End Theatre Awards 2010 for The Company Man
 Nominated, Best New Play at the Off West End Theatre Awards 2012 for Muswell Hill
 Nominated, Best New Play at the Off West End Theatre Awards 2014 for Invincible
 Nominated, Best Off West End Play at the WhatsonStage Awards 2018 for Monogamy

References

External links

1968 births
Living people
English dramatists and playwrights
People educated at Stamford School
People from Stamford, Lincolnshire
English male dramatists and playwrights